Crossed O (Ꚛ ꚛ; italics: Ꚛ ꚛ) is a letter of the Cyrillic script, similar to the Cyrillic letter O but with the addition of a cross.

Crossed O is used in the Old Church Slavonic language. The crossed o is primarily used in the word  (around, in the region of) in early Slavonic manuscripts, whose component  means 'cross'.

Computing codes

See also
Cyrillic characters in Unicode
Multiocular O
Earth symbol

References

External links
 Proposal to Encode Some Outstanding Early Cyrillic Characters in Unicode

Cross symbols